Heat shock protein 90kDa beta member 1 (HSP90B1), known also as endoplasmin, gp96, grp94, or ERp99, is a chaperone protein that in humans is encoded by the HSP90B1 gene.

HSP90B1 is an HSP90 paralogue that is found in the endoplasmic reticulum. It plays critical roles in folding proteins in the secretory pathway such as Toll-like receptors and integrins. It has been implicated as an essential immune chaperone to regulate both innate and adaptive immunity. Tumor-derived HSP90B1 (vitespen) has entered clinical trials for cancer immunotherapy.

grp94 has been shown to be a target for treatment of a plethora of diseases such as glaucoma, multiple myeloma, and metastatic cancer. grp94 includes 5 distinct amino acids in its primary sequence which creates 2 unique sub-pockets, S1 and S2. These sub-pockets have been utilized in current research in order to inhibit the chaperone since its client proteins seem to be up-regulated in cancer cells.

References

Further reading 

 
 
 
 
 
 
 
 
 
 
 
 
 
 
 
 
 
 
 

Molecular chaperones
Endoplasmic reticulum resident proteins